The 2005 V8 Supercar Championship Series was a motor racing championship for V8 Supercars. The series, which was the seventh V8 Supercar Championship Series, began on 18 March 2005 in Adelaide and ended on 27 November at Phillip Island Grand Prix Circuit after 13 rounds. The 46th Australian Touring Car Championship title was awarded to the series winner, Russell Ingall by the Confederation of Australian Motor Sport.

Teams and drivers

The following drivers and teams competed in the 2005 V8 Supercar Championship Series. 

* = Drove in Sandown 500 only
** = Drove in Bathurst 1000 only
 – Car #45 appeared as "Longhurst Racing" on some entry lists as a result of licence ownership issues.

Results and standings

Race calendar
The 2005 V8 Supercar Championship Series was contested over 13 rounds which included 11 single-driver sprint rounds and two two-driver endurance rounds.

Points system
Points were awarded on the results of each race as follows.

Drivers Championship

 Each round carried a maximum of 192, 186, 180 points etc. with each race at two-race rounds carrying half points and each race at three-race rounds carrying one third points.
 Each driver was required to drop his/her worst score from the first ten rounds.
 Gross total points are shown within brackets.

Teams Championship

(S) denotes a single car team.

Champion Manufacturer
Ford was awarded the Champion Manufacturer title, having achieved the most round wins during the series.

References

External links
 Official V8 Supercar site
 2005 Racing Results Archive 

Supercars Championship seasons
V8 Supercar Championship Series